Peng Shuai was the defending champion, but chose to compete in an ITF event in Tokyo instead.

Kirsten Flipkens won the title, defeating CoCo Vandeweghe in the final, 7–6(7–4), 6–4. Flipkens beat five American players in five matches on the way to her first WTA 125K series title.

Seeds
All seeds received a bye into the second round.

Draw

Finals

Top half

Section 1

Section 2

Bottom half

Section 3

Section 4

Qualifying

Seeds

Qualifiers

Lucky loser

Qualifying draw

First qualifier

Second qualifier

References
Main Draw
Qualifying Draw

Oracle Challenger Series - Houston - Singles